Danilo dos Santos Ribeiro, better known as Danilo Ribeiro or Danilo Goiano (born 21 February 1983, in Goiânia) is a Brazilian football midfielder last playing for Clube Esportivo Lajeadense.

Career
Before moving to Europe, Danilo played in Sport Club Recife and Ponte Preta. In 2005, he moved to Greece where he played in Greek Super League club Levadiakos F.C. the first half of the season, and then in Olympiakos Volos F.C. the rest. In summer 2007 he returned to Brazil where he played, until next summer in Porto Alegre F.C. In 2008, he returned to Europe this time to play in Montenegrin First League club FK Zeta. After one season there he returned to Brazil, first to play in Clube Náutico Marcílio Dias and then with Clube Atlético Sorocaba and Trindade Atlético Clube. In 2010, he moved to Iran to play with Shahrdari Tabriz And 2011 until 2013 in Mes Rafsanjan F.C. 2014 he play in Ríver Atlético Clube 2015 Goiânia Esporte Clube 2016 Clube Esportivo Lajeadense

Club career statistics

Last Updated 12 June 2016

 Assist Goals

External sources
 

Living people
1983 births
Sportspeople from Goiânia
Brazilian footballers
Brazilian expatriate footballers
Sport Club do Recife players
Associação Atlética Ponte Preta players
Levadiakos F.C. players
Super League Greece players
Olympiacos Volos F.C. players
Expatriate footballers in Greece
Expatriate footballers in Iran
Porto Alegre Futebol Clube players
FK Zeta players
Shahrdari Tabriz players
Expatriate footballers in Montenegro
Clube Atlético Sorocaba players
Association football midfielders
River Atlético Clube players
Goiânia Esporte Clube